Route 116 or Highway 116 can refer to multiple roads:

Brazil
 BR-116

Canada
  New Brunswick Route 116
  Prince Edward Island Route 116
  Quebec Route 116

Costa Rica
 National Route 116

India
 National Highway 116 (India)

Japan
 Route 116 (Japan)

United States
  U.S. Route 116 (former)
  U.S. Route 116 (Wisconsin) (former proposal)
  Alabama State Route 116
  Arkansas Highway 116
  Arkansas Highway 116 (1927) (former)
  California State Route 116
  Colorado State Highway 116
  Connecticut Route 116
  Florida State Road 116
  County Road 116 (Duval County, Florida)
  Georgia State Route 116
  Illinois Route 116
  Indiana State Road 116
  Iowa Highway 116
  K-116 (Kansas highway)
  Louisiana Highway 116
  Maine State Route 116
  Maryland Route 116 (former)
  Massachusetts Route 116
  M-116 (Michigan highway)
  Minnesota State Highway 116 (1934–1955) (former)
  Minnesota State Highway 116 (1965–1976) (former)
  Missouri Route 116
  Nebraska Highway 116
  Nevada State Route 116
  New Hampshire Route 116
  County Route 116 (Bergen County, New Jersey)
  New Mexico State Road 116
  New York State Route 116
  County Route 116 (Fulton County, New York)
  County Route 116A (Fulton County, New York)
  County Route 116 (Niagara County, New York)
  County Route 116 (Rensselaer County, New York)
  County Route 116 (Suffolk County, New York)
  County Route 116 (Sullivan County, New York)
  North Carolina Highway 116
  Ohio State Route 116
  Oklahoma State Highway 116
  Pennsylvania Route 116
  Rhode Island Route 116
  South Carolina Highway 116
  South Dakota Highway 116 (former)
  Tennessee State Route 116
  Texas State Highway 116 (former)
  Texas State Highway Loop 116
  Texas State Highway Spur 116 (former)
  Farm to Market Road 116
  Utah State Route 116
  Vermont Route 116
  Virginia State Route 116
  Virginia State Route 116 (1923-1928) (former)
  Virginia State Route 116 (1928-1930) (former)
  Virginia State Route 116 (1930-1932) (former)
  Washington State Route 116
  Wisconsin Highway 116
  Wyoming Highway 116

Territories
  Puerto Rico Highway 116
  Puerto Rico Highway 116R (former)

See also
A116
D116 road
P116
R116 road (Ireland)
S116 (Amsterdam)